Susan Barnes,   (born September 8, 1952) is a Canadian former politician. Barnes represented the riding of London West from 1993 (following her election in 1993) until 2008 as a Liberal member of the House of Commons of Canada. She was the first Maltese-born Member of Parliament.  She is the longest-serving MP to represent the riding of London West and was also the first woman to be elected as a federal MP in London, Ontario.

Early life
Barnes was born in Rabat, Malta, and immigrated to Canada with her family in 1957. She received bachelor's degrees in literature and law from the University of Western Ontario in 1974 and 1977, respectively. She was admitted to The Law Society of Upper Canada in 1979 and practiced law full-time until 1993.

Political career
She was the Official Opposition critic for the Minister of Justice, and served as Parliamentary Secretary to the Minister of Indian Affairs and Northern Development and Federal Interlocutor for Métis and Non-Status Indians, the Minister of National Revenue and the  Minister of Justice and Attorney General of Canada with special emphasis on Judicial Transparency and Aboriginal Justice.

Electoral record

References

External links
 Official website (archived)
 How'd They Vote?: Sue Barnes' voting history and quotes
 

1952 births
Living people
Canadian women lawyers
Women members of the House of Commons of Canada
Lawyers in Ontario
Liberal Party of Canada MPs
Maltese emigrants to Canada
Members of the House of Commons of Canada from Ontario
Members of the King's Privy Council for Canada
Members of the United Church of Canada
People from Rabat, Malta
Politicians from London, Ontario
Women in Ontario politics
21st-century Canadian politicians
21st-century Canadian women politicians